Oneillite is a rare mineral of the eudialyte group with the chemical formula . The formula is based on the original one but extended to show the presence of cyclic silicate groups and domination of Si at the M4 site. The mineral has lowered symmetry (space group R3, instead of more specific for the group R3m one) due to Ca-Mn ordering.  Similar feature is displayed by some other eudialyte-group members: aqualite, labyrinthite, raslakite, and voronkovite. Oneillite is strongly enriched in rare earth elements (REE, mainly cerium), but REE do not dominate any of its sites.

Notes on chemistry
Rare earth elements in oneillite include cerium, lanthanum, neodymium, and yttrium, with minor praseodymium and gadolinium. Other impurities are potassium, and minor amounts of aluminium, hafnium, strontium and tantalum.

Occurrence and association
Oneillite is one of four eudialyte-group minerals discovered within alkaline rocks of Mont Saint-Hilaire, Quebec, Canada. It associates with aegirine, albite, sodalite, and pyrite.

References

Cyclosilicates
Sodium minerals
Calcium minerals
Manganese minerals
Iron(II) minerals
Zirconium minerals
Niobium minerals
Trigonal minerals
Minerals in space group 146